Marcel Granollers was the defending champion, but lost to Łukasz Kubot in the second round.
Thomaz Bellucci won the tournament by defeating Janko Tipsarević 6–7(6–8), 6–4, 6–2 in the final.

Seeds
The top four seeds receive a bye into the second round.

Draw

Finals

Top half

Bottom half

Qualifying

Seeds

Qualifiers

Draw

First qualifier

Second qualifier

Third qualifier

Fourth qualifier

References
 Main Draw
 Qualifying Draw

2012 ATP World Tour
2012 Singles
Singles